Yun Du-su (1533–1601) was a Korean scholar-official of the Joseon Kingdom. He was a politician, poet, writer, scholar, and part of the Yi Hwang school among Westerners (Hangul: 서인, Korean: Seoin). Among many other official positions, he served as Chief State Councillor during the reign of King Seonjo. His pen name was Oheum (오음, 梧陰), courtesy name was Jaang (자앙, 子仰).

Early life

Birth and family 
Yun Du-su was born in 1533 at Hansung. His father was Yun Byeon (윤변, 尹忭; 1493–1549), who was government official. There were half brothers Yun Dam-soo and Yun Chun-soo, who are about 20 years older than Yoon Doo-su, and Yun Geun-su, his younger brother, below them.

His father was taught by Yu Woon and Jo Gwangjo. When the third literati purge of 1519 took place and Jo Gwangjo was imprisoned, he pleaded not guilty, and for this reason, he was called a partisan of Kimyo and rejected.

His younger brother Yun Geun-su was also a major politician during reign of King Seonjo and Gwanghaegun. His family origin is from Haepyeong Yun clan and his family progenitor was Yun Gun-jeong (윤군정, 尹君正) who served as Pan-gongbusa (Chairman of supreme government office) of Goryeo dynasty during era of Gojong of Goryeo and Wonjong (원종, 元宗, 1219–1274).

Education 
In 1549, he lost his father at the age of 17 but devoted himself to his studies under Yi Jung-ho. In 1552, he studied under the leadership of Seong Su-chim. At this time, he met Seong Hon and became a lifelong friend, and due to this influence, He chose the Westerners when the Bungdang was formed later. After entering the government office, he visited Yi Hwang in Andong, and became his pupil.

Career

Myeongjong era (1558–1567) 
Yun Doo-su was the first-rank passer of the Classics Licentiate Examination (생원시) at the age of 23 in 1555, and in 1558, he passed the regular triennial civil service examination (식년문과) as a seventh place and worked at the Office of Diplomatic Correspondence (승문원). Afterwards, he went through the Editorial Examiners of the Office of Royal Decrees (예문관검열), the proofreader (정자) and first copyist (저작) of the Office of Special Advisors (홍문관), and became Assistant Section Chief of the Ministry of Military Affairs (병조좌랑) in 1561, Assistant Section Chief of the Ministry of Personnel (이조좌랑) in 1562.

In 1563, when Yun Doo-su was as Section Chief of the Ministry of Personnel, Yi Yang, then an authority having person, recommended his son Yi Jeong-bin and his friend Yu Young-gil to the ministries to expand his power. Yun Doo-su opposed this with Bak So-rip and Yi Hu-baek and was impeached by the Office of the Inspector General in July and lost his government post. Later, Yi Yang had been dismissed and Yun doo-su was found not guilty by the intercourse of Chief State Councilor Yun Won-hyung and Right State Councilor Sim Tong-won and appointed to the position of sixth counselor (수찬) and promoted to the Section Chief of the Ministry of Personnel (이조정랑) later.

Yun Doo-su was in charge of the editorial clerks (검상) and First Secretary (사인) in State Council (의정부), went back and forth between the Office of the Inspector General and Sungkyunkwan, and then moved to the Office the Royal Stables (사복시). In 1565, he worked as the directorate of the Royal royal coffin hall (빈전도청) as assistant responding editor of the Office of Special Advisors (홍문관부응교) at the mourning of Queen Munjeong. After the work was over, he was raised to the Grand Master of Comprehensive Governance (통정대부) and also appointed as the head of the Five Guards (오위장). In January 1566, he was appointed as the Sixth Royal Secretary (동부승지) and was promoted to the Right Assistant Royal Secretary (우부승지). In August 1566, he was selected as the Left Assistant Royal Secretary (좌부승지).

In 1567, when King Myeongjong was in critical condition, he was in Royal Secretariat as the Right Royal Secretary (우승지) and sent it to Prime Minister Yi Jun-kyeong writing a testament citing the past and saying, "Wen Yanbo of Song Dynasty came into the palace and slept." Upon receiving this, Yi Jun-kyeong soon slept in a place where he was on duty, and he was able to receive the order left at the time of death of Myeongjong that night. In doing so, Yun doo-su stabilized the situation considered unstable and suspected that the king did not have a crown prince to die after.

Seonjo era (1567–1601) 
In the early days of King Seonjo's accession, the political situation was operated around two tasks: establishing a new political order led by Sarim and liquidating politics of kinship, by redressing a grievance and hiring those affected by fourth literati purge of 1545. In accordance with this stance, Yun Doo-su was appointed to the third minister of personnel (이조참의) through a Chief Censor (대사간) of the Office of Censors (사간원). Yun Doo-su was in charge of the supervision of gwageo in August 1574, and appointed to the assistant examiners (대독관) next month.

In 1575, due to the conflict between Sim Ui-gyeom and Gim Hyo-won over the appointment of Section Chief of the Ministry of Personnel, Sarim was divided into the Easterners and the Westerners. At this time, Yun Doo-su participated in the Westerners. In July 1576, he was appointed as a Chief Censor, and his nephew Yun Hyun was appointed as Assistant Section Chief of the Ministry of Personnel. Yun Doo-su and Yun Geun-su suppressed the Easterners while they were in key positions. Yun Doo-su, Yun Geun-su, and Yun Hyun were called Yun Trio (삼윤), and the Easterners had a bad feeling about them. In the midst of this, a bribery case occurred by the magistrate of the Jindo County, and Yun Trio was involved in this case. Eventually, Yun Doo-su was dismissed due to the impeachment of the Office of Censors and Office of the Inspector General in March 1579.

As Inspector General (대사헌) Gim Gye-hwi requested, Yoon Doo-soo was appointed again and became Magistrate of Yeonan Strategic Prefecture (연안도호부사). In the famine of 1580 to 1581, the people were helped to live by him, and there were about 1,000 people who came and ate from distant regions, and when a royal secret inspector (어사) reported this, King Seonjo especially gave him silk clothes. Later, he served as second magistrate of Hansung (한성좌윤) and Second Minister of Punishment (형조참판), and in 1587, when the Japanese invaded Jeolla Province, he was appointed as a governor of Jeolla province to reform the discipline of chiefs and leaders and punish criminals.

In 1588, Yun Du-su became second deputy directors of Privy Council (동지중추부사) in June and governor of Pyeongan Province (평안도관찰사) and magistrate of Pyongyang Magistracy (평안부윤) in autumn. When there was news that the leader of the barbarians was coming to the western border, Yun Du-su strategically responded by reducing the number of soldiers belonging to the military and increasing the number of troops from four to six because they ran away increased day by day. The following year, he taught the people around Yalu River how to plant cotton in Pyongyang. In 1590, he was established as Gwanggukgongsin and sealed to Haewongun due to the contribution of correcting the Joseon dynasty's genealogy. In August of that year, he resigned his original position and went up to the Minister of Punishments (형조판서) and became the Inspector General. A month later, he became a Fourth Superintendent of Privy Council (지중추부사). He became the Inspector General again in 1591.

In March 1591, he became the Minister of Taxation, but in June, He had decided to support Prince Shinseong with Yi San-hae, but he supported Gwanghaegun in the Geonjeo issue, a partisan fight between the Easterners and the Westerners, so King Seonjo was angry and divested Yun Du-su of his office and exiled him with his younger brother Yun Geun-su to Hoeryong. After that, He was transferred to Hongwon due to the continued impeachment of the Easterners.

Japanese invasions of Korea (1592–1598) 

In March 1591, a letter sent by Toyotomi Hideyoshi through Joseon Tongsinsa said he would invade Ming dynasty, but unlike other subjects who insisted on hiding it from the Ming dynasty, he actively insisted on telling the Ming Dynasty the situation of Japan. In October 1591, when he was exiled to Hongwon, diplomatic envoys to Ming (진주사) returned from Beijing. When they reported that the Wanli Emperor praised the situation of Japan in detail, the royal court tried to let him go of his exile for his contribution, but he was transferred to Haeju due to opposition from the Office of Censors and the Office of the Inspector General. On April 13, 1592, when Japan captured Dongnae following Busan, he was released on 23 April as king's special order.

On April 28, it was reported that Sin Rip had been defeated in Chungju, so King Seonjo proposed royal flight from the palace and it was decided the next day. Yun Doo-su joined King Seonjo's departure to the west at the dawn of April 30 as an official holding sinecure post. Arriving in Kaesong on May 1, the procession of the royal carriage took Yun Doo-su as the captain of Office of the Directorate General (어영대장) on May 2 and sacrificed to Right State Councilor the next day. Yun Doo-su insisted on sending an address to Liaodong to announce the war, punishing those who did not come with king as court officials, and remaining in Kaesong and defending. However, when King Seonjo heard that Kyongsong had fallen, he wanted to leave Kaesong. Yun Doo-su requested that the royal carriage leaves early in the morning, but it was not accepted. Accordingly, Yun Du-su sent the governor of Hwanghae to soothe people so that the procession could leave Kaesong safely.

The royal carriage left Kaesong on May 3 and arrived in Pyongyang on May 7. On May 9, he became Left State Councilor. On May 19, discussions took place on asking Ming for relief forces. Yun Du-su objected to this for three reasons. First, Joseon's soldiers are guarding Imjin River and have enough troops. Second, it is not clear that the Ming government will send troops. Third, the military in Liaodong and Guangning have a ferocious nature and various villages in Pyongan Province will be devastated. However, as the situation became increasingly urgent, Yun Du-su also agreed to the request for relief forces. He also insisted on protecting Pyongyang in discussions on whether to protect Pyongyang or move to another place. King Seonjo refused to accept this and asked to discuss the next destination, and Yun Du-su recommended going to Uiju rather than Hamhung. The procession left for Uiju, and Yun Du-su remained with Yi Won-ik to protect Pyongyang.

Family 
Parents and Siblings
Father: Yun Byeon (윤변, 尹忭) (1493 - 8 July 1549)
Step-mother - Lady Yi of the Jeonju Yi clan (전주 이씨)
Older step-brother - Yun Dam-su (윤담수, 尹聃壽)
Older step-brother - Yun Chun-su (윤춘수, 尹春壽) (1521 - ?)
Older step-brother - Yun Gi-su (윤기수, 尹期壽)
Mother: Lady Hyeon of the Palgeo Hyeon clan (팔거 현씨, 八莒 玄氏) (? - 1544)
Older step-sister - Lady Yun of the Haepyeong Yun clan (해평 윤씨)
Younger brother - Yun Geun-su (윤근수, 尹根壽) (1537 - 17 August 1616)
Wives and their children 
Lady Hwang of the Changwon Hwang clan (창원 황씨, 昌原 黃氏) (? - 1591)
Son - Yun Bang (윤방, 尹昉) (22 June 1563 - August 1640)
Son - Yun Heun (윤흔, 尹昕) (1564 - 17 December 1638)
Son - Yun Hwi (윤휘, 尹暉) (1571 - 1644)
Son - Yun Hwon (윤훤, 尹暄)
Unnamed concubine 
Son - Yun Gan (윤간, 尹旰) (1573 - 12 February 1665)

Writings 
 Oheum-yugo 《오음유고》 (梧陰遺稿)
 Gija-ji 《기자지》 (箕子誌)
 Seongin-rok 《성인록 成仁錄》
 Pyeongyang-ji 《평양지 平壤志》
 Yeonan-ji 《연안지 延安志》

As a scholar 
As most intelligent mind of Neo-Confucian philosophy, he interacted with masters of Neo-Confucianism school, such as Seong Hon, Song Ik-pil, Yi I, and Yi Hwang.

Most of his writings are written during the Japanese invasions of Korea.

Popular culture
 Portrayed by Jung Dong-hwan in the 2004-2005 KBS1 TV series Immortal Admiral Yi Sun-sin.

References

1533 births
1601 deaths
16th-century Korean poets
Korean Confucianists
16th-century Korean philosophers
Korean politicians
Korean scholars
Neo-Confucian scholars
People from Seoul